Ambrogio Fogar (13 August 1941 – 24 August 2005) was an Italian sailor, writer, rally driver and all-round adventurer and television presenter. He was a Commander of the Order of Merit of the Italian Republic, gold medal for athletic value, gold medal for marine value, gold medal to memory and other.

Biography
His exploits included a number of successful long-distance sailing feats, such as becoming the first Italian to sail single-handedly from east to west around the world, starting and ending his journey in Castiglione della Pescaia, Tuscany. In 1978, after being capsized by orcas, he survived more than ten weeks in a life raft in the South Atlantic along with a friend, journalist Mauro Mancini, who died of pneumonia two days after the two were rescued. Another venture was Fogar's solo sled expedition to the North Pole. He competed several times in the Dakar Rally and in the Rallye des Pharaons.

In 1992, Fogar was paralyzed from the neck down following a jeep accident while rallying in Turkmenistan. This did not end his adventurous spirit, and in 1997, in a wheelchair, he competed in a round-Italy yacht race.

He died in 2005 of a heart attack and is buried at the Monumental Cemetery of Milan, Italy.

Personal life
Fogar was the father of Rachele and Francesca Fogar. Rachele Fogar was born in Milan on 31 July 1991 and Francesca Fogar was born in Tradate on 17 November 1975.

Television
 Jonathan - Dimensione avventura (Canale 5, 1984–1986; Italia 1, 1986–1991)
 Antologia di Jonathan (Canale 5, 1984–1986; Italia 1, 1986–1991)
 Parliamone - talk of Buongiorno Italia (Canale 5, 1987–1988)
 Campo base - Il mondo dell'avventura (TV Koper-Capodistria/Canale 5, 1989–1991; TELE+2, 1990–1991)
 Speciale campo base (TV Koper-Capodistria/Canale 5, 1989–1991; TELE+2, 1990–1991)

Radio documentary
 Poli Mirabilia - La marcia sul pack e altre meraviglie (Rai Radio 1, 1984)

Documentary
 Ambrogio Fogar - il viaggio (Italia 1, 1998)
 Ambrogio Fogar, l'ultimo eroe (Rete 4, 2005)

Books

See also 
List of people who disappeared mysteriously at sea
Rachele Fogar

References

External links

1941 births
1970s missing person cases
2005 deaths
20th-century Italian writers
21st-century Italian writers
Burials at the Cimitero Monumentale di Milano
Circumnavigators of the globe
Commanders of the Order of Merit of the Italian Republic
Formerly missing people
Italian explorers
Italian male sailors (sport)
Italian sailors
Italian television presenters
People with tetraplegia
Single-handed circumnavigating sailors
Single-handed sailors
Università Cattolica del Sacro Cuore alumni
Wheelchair users